John Henry Hoeven III (born March 13, 1957) is an American banker and politician serving as the senior U.S. senator from North Dakota, a seat he has held since 2011. A member of the Republican Party, Hoeven served as the 31st governor of North Dakota from 2000 to 2010.

In 2010, Hoeven was elected to the U.S. Senate, succeeding Senator Byron Dorgan, who chose not to seek reelection. Hoeven became North Dakota's senior senator in 2013 after Kent Conrad retired and was succeeded by Heidi Heitkamp, who was once Hoeven's opponent for the governor's office.

Before being elected governor, Hoeven was a banker who served in numerous executive roles at various banks, most notably as president of the nation's only state-owned bank, the Bank of North Dakota, from 1993 to 2000. He is on the board of directors at First Western Bank & Trust and has an estimated net worth of $45 million, making him one of the wealthiest U.S. senators. He is the dean of North Dakota's congressional delegation.

Early life, education, and early career
Hoeven was born in Bismarck, North Dakota, the son of Patricia "Trish" (née Chapman) and John Henry "Jack" Hoeven, Jr. His father owned a bank in Minot, North Dakota, where he worked as the president and chairman. Hoeven's ancestry is Dutch, Swedish, and English.

Hoeven studied at Dartmouth College, which his father also attended. Hoeven belonged to the Alpha Chi Alpha fraternity and graduated with honors with a BA in 1979. While there, he played on the men's golf team.

After Dartmouth, Hoeven attended the Kellogg School of Management at Northwestern University, graduating with an MBA in 1981.

Banking career 
From 1986 to 1993, Hoeven was executive vice president of First Western Bank & Trust, an institution his father bought in 1970. At one time, he owned 39% of the bank’s parent company, Westbrand, Inc. From 1993 to 2000, he was the president and CEO of the Bank of North Dakota, under governor Ed Schafer.

Governor of North Dakota

Elections

2000 

In 2000 Hoeven ran for governor of North Dakota as a Republican and won, defeating Democratic NPL nominee Heidi Heitkamp, 55% to 45%.

2004 

Hoeven was reelected over Democratic-NPL nominee Joe Satrom with 71% of the vote.

2008 

On November 13, 2007, Hoeven announced his candidacy for a third term and kicked off his campaign with stops in Fargo, Grand Forks, Bismarck and Minot. He was reelected with 74% of the vote over Democratic-NPL nominee Tim Mathern. It was the first time in North Dakota history that a governor won three four-year terms in office, though the record for serving is still maintained by Bill Guy, who served 12 years.

Tenure
Hoeven's governorship included the expansion and diversification of the state's economy, which led to a 49.5% increase in the state's real gross domestic product. Beginning in 2000, he directed the development of a multi-resource energy program for the state with incentives in each energy sector, making North Dakota one of the country's largest energy-producing and exporting states. The state gained nearly 40,000 new jobs during his tenure. Wages and personal incomes grew faster than the national average. For a few years, the state led the nation in export growth. In late 2006, the state's reserve rose past $600 million, and it is now over $700 million.

In December 2009, Hoeven was the country's most popular governor. His approval rating stood at 87% with only 10% disapproving. In January 2007, Hoeven became the nation's most senior governor, having been inaugurated on December 15, 2000, as established by the North Dakota Constitution.

U.S. Senate

Elections

2010 

On January 11, 2010, Hoeven announced he would run in the 2010 North Dakota Senate election for the seat being vacated by Byron Dorgan. Hoeven defeated Democratic-NPL nominee Tracy Potter, 76% to 22%, making him the first Republican to represent North Dakota in the Senate since 1987.

2016 

Hoeven was reelected in 2016.

2022 

Hoeven was reelected in 2022.

Tenure 
Since 2013, Hoeven has been the dean of North Dakota's congressional delegation. As of 2018, he was listed as one of the seven wealthiest U.S. senators.

For his tenure as the chair of the Senate Indian Affairs Committee in the 116th Congress, Hoeven earned an F grade from the nonpartisan Lugar Center's Congressional Oversight Hearing Index.

Committee assignments
Committee on Agriculture, Nutrition, and Forestry
Subcommittee on Commodities, Markets, Trade and Risk Management
Subcommittee on Jobs, Rural Economic Growth and Energy Innovation
Subcommittee on Nutrition, Specialty Crops, Food and Agricultural Research (chair)
Committee on Appropriations
Subcommittee on Agriculture, Rural Development, Food and Drug Administration, and Related Agencies
Subcommittee on Homeland Security (chair)
Subcommittee on Energy and Water Development
Subcommittee on Interior, Environment, and Related Agencies
Subcommittee on Military Construction, Veterans Affairs, and Related Agencies
Committee on Energy and Natural Resources
Subcommittee on Energy
Subcommittee on National Parks
Subcommittee on Public Lands, Forests and Mining
Committee on Indian Affairs (chair)

Political positions
Hoeven was briefly a member of the Democratic-NPL Party before becoming active in the Republican Party as a district chair and volunteer. He has walked a conservative line on some issues and a moderate one on others, including increasing education funding, ethics reform, compensation for teachers, as well as increased funding on infrastructure. On August 10, 2021, Hoeven was one of 19 Senate Republicans to vote with the Democratic caucus in favor of the Infrastructure Investment and Jobs Act.

Crime
Hoeven supports decreasing access to parole for offenders. He believes that drug control policy should be a state issue, not a federal one.

Economy and employment
Hoeven opposed the Employee Free Choice Act, which included a card check provision.

Energy and environment
Hoeven believes that alternative fuels are a long-term solution but that increased oil drilling is required in the short term. He has been a vocal advocate for the Keystone Pipeline, falsely asserting that it has never leaked and claiming that environmental risks have been exaggerated. The Keystone Pipeline has in fact leaked twice, in 2010 and in 2016.

In 2015, Hoeven submitted an amendment asserting that climate change is real and that humans are contributing to it but also that the Keystone Pipeline would not contribute to climate change. His League of Conservation Voters score for 2018 was 7%.

Gun policy
Hoeven consistently votes for pro-gun legislation and has earned an A+ rating from the National Rifle Association (NRA). The NRA has endorsed him repeatedly, including during his campaigns for governor in 2008 and senator in 2010.

In June 2016, Hoeven voted on four gun control proposals that were developed as a result of the Orlando nightclub shooting. He voted for Chuck Grassley's expansion of background checks and provision of funding to research the cause of mass shootings, and for John Cornyn's 72-hour wait period for purchases of guns by people on the terrorist watchlist. He voted against Chris Murphy's proposal to require background checks for every gun sale, including online sales and at gun shows, and against Dianne Feinstein's proposal to ban anyone on the terrorist watchlist from buying a gun. Hoeven voted against the latter bill due to its lack of "judicial oversight or due process".

Women's Issues 
Hoeven identifies as pro-life, opposing abortion in all cases except for rape, incest, or threat to the mother's life. He opposes government funding for elective abortions and supports the Hyde Amendment, which permits federal funding for abortion services only under the above stated exceptions. Hoeven voted to reauthorize the Violence Against Women Act in 2012.

Israel Anti-Boycott Act 
In April 2017, Hoeven co-sponsored the Israel Anti-Boycott Act (s. 720), which would bar federal contractors from participating in boycotts against Israel or Israeli settlements.

Immigration
In 2013, Hoeven voted for the Border Security, Economic Opportunity, and Immigration Modernization Act of 2013.

LGBT rights
In 2013, Hoeven voted against banning discrimination based on sexual orientation. He opposes same-sex marriage. In 2022, he voted against federal protections for same-sex married couples.

January 6th
On May 28, 2021, Hoeven voted against creating an independent commission to investigate the 2021 United States Capitol attack.

Taxes
Hoeven supports investment tax credits for farm investments.

Electoral history

References

Further reading

External links

Senator John Hoeven official U.S. Senate website
John Hoeven for Senate

|-

|-

|-

|-

|-

|-

|-

1957 births
21st-century American politicians
American bankers
American people of Dutch descent
American people of English descent
American people of Swedish descent
Dartmouth College alumni
Governors of North Dakota
Kellogg School of Management alumni
Living people
North Dakota Democrats
North Dakota Republicans
People from Minot, North Dakota
Politicians from Bismarck, North Dakota
Republican Party governors of North Dakota
Republican Party United States senators from North Dakota